Zhi Yao, Xun Yao, or Zhi Boyao, posthumously known as Zhi Xiangzi, was the ruler of Zhi, a vassal state of Jin during the late Spring and Autumn period. He was the son of Zhi Shen. He was the last Zhongjunjiang (Prime minister) of Jin before its partition.

Zhi Yao's dramatic death was a significant event in Chinese history. As the dominant vassal state, he asked Kangzi of Han, Huanzi of Wei and Xiangzi of Zhao to cede their lands to the Zhi clan. Han and Wei did so according to Zhi's wish. However, Zhao refused to give lands to Zhi clan. Xiangzi was angered and led his army, along with the army from Han and Wei, laid siege on the Zhao capital Jinyang (modern Taiyuan). The siege lasted two years before it came to a dramatic end. Zhao conspired with Han and Wei's ruler, Xiangzi was betrayed by his own allies and defeated. Zhao decapitated Zhi Yao and massacred his entire family of over 200 members. After the fall of Zhi clan, no vassals in Jin could once again match the power of Zhao, Han, and Wei. The Duke of Jin was consequently turned into a figurehead. This eventually led to the Partition of Jin and the establishment of Han, Zhao and Wei as independent states acknowledged by the Zhou dynasty King of China, marking the end of the Spring and Autumn period and the beginning of the Warring States period.

Ascendance 
When choosing Xiangzi as his successor, Xuanzi of Zhi was warned by his clansman Zhi Guo who believed that Xiangzi's personality did not fit the quality of a ruler. However, Xuanzi dismissed Guo's opinion.

In 472 BC. The third year of Duke Chu of Jin's rule. Xiangzi led his army invaded the state of Qi. He managed to defeat Qi's troops in the battle of Liqiu. Zuo Qiuming recorded this battle in his work Zuo Zhuan. In the Zuo Zhuan, it is shown that Xiangzi of Zhi resented oracles of I Ching because Zhi believed in his own power. In 468 BC, Xiangzi of Zhi invaded the state of Zheng. Zheng's retainer Sihong then asked Qi for reinforcement. With the intervention of Qi, Zhi had to abandon his plan of invading Zheng. In 464 BC, Zhi once more entered Zheng's realm with the troops from Zhi clan and Zhao clan. Zheng's Sihong organized resistance against them.

In 458 BC, Zhi united the army of Han, Zhao and Wei, he attacked and exterminated two major clans of Jin: the Fan and the Zhonghang. On the one hand Zhi took most parts of Fan and Zhonghang's fief, on the other hand he also climbed to the top of Jin's court. Zhao clan which was in charge before Zhi's sudden rise, was substituted. In an occasion of banquet, Xiangzi of Zhi and Xiangzi of Zhao met. According to Han dynasty scholar Liu An, Zhi slapped on Zhao's skull. This insult offended Zhao's retainers deeply but also strengthened Zhao's patience.

Xiangzi then conquered the vassal state Qiuyou of Zhongshan. In 457 BC, He greedily claimed lands from Han , Wei and Zhao. Unexpectedly, Xiangzi of Zhao refused Zhi's request harshly. Xiangzi of Zhi was enraged by Zhao's response to him. He led his troops marched to Zhao's territory with the help of Han and Wei. Xiangzi of Zhao , upon seeing his strong forces, decided to retreat to Jinyang.

Fall of the Zhi clan 
In 453 BC. Xiangzi of Zhi ordered the water attack of Zhao's Jinyang. He diverted the water of Fen river to Jinyang. As a consequence, Zhao's capital was flooded and its army was starving.

Xiangzi of Zhi was fairly content about the situation of Zhao. He told Kangzi of Han and Huanzi of Wei that "At first, I did not know water can exterminate a nation, now I know." Kangzi and Huanzi were frightened by Xiangzi's words because they may themselves be in Zhao's predicament one day. 

At this point of time, Zhao sent its strategist Zhang Mengtan to work on Han and Wei. Mengtan spoke out about the fear of Han and Wei in front of their rulers----Zhi will eventually turn its arm against Han and Wei once Zhao is gone.

In 453 BC. Zhao's army destroyed the dam which controls the water diversion. Han and Wei, on the other hand, betrayed Zhi and began flanking the Zhi army. Xiangzi of Zhao led the storm himself. Xiangzi of Zhi was captured and decapitated. His skull was used as Zhao's wine cup as a symbol of glorious victory. Every member of Zhi clan was killed by Zhao. The battle marked the end of Zhi clan and the beginning of the  Partition of Jin.

References 

453 BC deaths
Year of birth unknown
Zhou dynasty nobility
Zhongjunjiang of Jin